Only Self is the debut studio album from American metalcore band Jesus Piece. It was released through Southern Lord Records on 24 August 2018 and produced by Andy Nelson of Weekend Nachos.

Critical reception

The album has received positive reviews from critics.

Writing for Pitchfork Andy O'Connor stated: "They’re part of a new metalcore movement that proves that experimentation and succinct, clobbering riffs can not only coexist but make for natural partners. On their first full-length, Only Self, they make the case that such should be the new tradition."

Track listing

Personnel
Jesus Piece
Aaron Heard — lead vocals
David Updike — guitars
John Distefano — guitars
Anthony Marinaro — bass
Luis Aponte — drums

Production
Brad Boatright — mastering
Andy Nelson — producer
Dom Pabon — album artwork

References

2018 debut albums
Jesus Piece (band) albums